Amsinckia marginata is a species of plant in the family Boraginaceae. It is endemic to Ecuador.  Its natural habitat is subtropical or tropical moist montane forests. It is threatened by habitat loss.

References

marginata
Endemic flora of Ecuador
Critically endangered plants
Taxonomy articles created by Polbot